King of Skiffle is an album by Lonnie Donegan. A CD version of the album was released in the United Kingdom on 18 February 1998 by Castle Music.  The CD was also released by Pickwick under the title The Best of Lonnie Donegan.

The first single from the album that was released was a version of Lead Belly's "Rock Island Line". It was the first debut record to go gold in the UK, and reached the Top 10 in the United States.

One of the songs, "My Old Man's a Dustman", reached #1 in the UK Singles Chart in April 1960. It was ranked #29 on the "Top 100 Hits of 1960" chart from Canadian Top 40 radio station, CHUM.

The other main hits from the album are "Cumberland Gap" and "Does Your Chewing Gum Lose Its Flavour (On the Bedpost Overnight?)" The latter was featured decades later in the Dr. Demento radio program, a show specializing in novelty songs. The song also appears on the Dr. Demento 20th anniversary two-disc set.

Track listing
All tracks composed by Lonnie Donegan; except where noted.
"Rock Island Line" (Huddie Ledbetter, John Lomax; arranged by Lonnie Donegan)  	
"Jack O Diamonds" (John Lomax)
"Tom Dooley" (Traditional; arranged by John Lomax, Frank Proffitt, Frank Warner and Alan Lomax)
"Puttin' On the Style" (Traditional; arranged by Norman Cazden)
"I'm Alabammy Bound" 
"Wabash Cannonball" (Traditional; arranged by Lonnie Donegan)
"Wreck of the Old 97" (Charles Noell, Fred Lewey, Henry Whitter)
"The Battle of New Orleans" (Jimmy Driftwood)
"Bring a Little Water Sylvie" (Huddie Ledbetter; arranged by Lonnie Donegan and Paul Campbell)
"Nobody Loves Like an Irishman" 
"Michael Row the Boat Ashore" 
"Does Your Chewing Gum Lose Its Flavour (On the Bedpost Overnight?)" (Lonnie Donegan, Ernest Breuer)
"My Old Man's a Dustman" (Lonnie Donegan, Beverley Thorn, Peter Buchanan)
"Cumberland Gap" 
"Don't You Rock Me Daddy-O" (Bill Varley, Wally Whyton)
"Grand Coulee Dam" (Traditional; arranged by Lonnie Donegan and Woody Guthrie)	  	
"Have a Drink On Me" (John Lomax, Huddie Ledbetter, Alan Lomax, Lonnie Donegan, Peter Buchanan)
"Gamblin' Man" (Lonnie Donegan, Woody Guthrie)	  	
"Nobody's Child" (Cy Coben, Mel Foree)

This compilation album is similar to a 1970 double album (same name) with 22 stereo tracks released by Deutsche Vogue Schallplatten GmbH under the Pye label. "Rock Island Line" and "Wreck of the Old 97" are the exclusions, whilst the 1970 version included:

"Seven Golden Daffodils"
"Rock O' my Soul"
"Fort Worth Jail"
"Jimmy Brown the Newsboy"
"Frankie and Johnny"

References 

1998 compilation albums